In enzymology, a salutaridinol 7-O-acetyltransferase is an enzyme that catalyzes the chemical reaction

acetyl-CoA + salutaridinol  CoA + 7-O-acetylsalutaridinol

Thus, the two substrates of this enzyme are acetyl-CoA and salutaridinol, whereas its two products are CoA and 7-O-acetylsalutaridinol.

This enzyme belongs to the family of transferases, specifically those acyltransferases transferring groups other than aminoacyl groups.  The systematic name of this enzyme class is acetyl-CoA:salutaridinol 7-O-acetyltransferase. This enzyme participates in alkaloid biosynthesis i.

References

 
 

EC 2.3.1
Enzymes of unknown structure